Charles Richard Eckert (January 20, 1868 –   October 26, 1959) was a Democratic member of the U.S. House of Representatives from Pennsylvania from 1935 to 1939.

Biography
Charles Richard Eckert was born in Pittsburgh, Pennsylvania. He attended Piersol's Academy at West Bridgewater, Pennsylvania, and Geneva College at Beaver Falls, Pennsylvania. He studied law, and was admitted to the bar in 1894 and commenced practice in Beaver, Pennsylvania.

Political career
He was a delegate to the 1928 Democratic National Convention.

Eckert was elected as a Democrat to the Seventy-fourth and Seventy-fifth Congresses. He was an unsuccessful candidate for reelection in 1938.

Retirement and death
After his time in Congress, he served as a member of board of directors of the Beaver Trust Co., and resumed the practice of law until his death, aged 91, as the result of an automobile accident in Rochester, Pennsylvania.

Sources

The Political Graveyard

1868 births
1959 deaths
Pennsylvania lawyers
Politicians from Pittsburgh
Road incident deaths in Pennsylvania
Geneva College alumni
Democratic Party members of the United States House of Representatives from Pennsylvania